Université d'Abobo-Adjamé or the University of Abobo-Adjamé (UAA) is part of the University of Cocody, one of two public universities in Abidjan, the economic capital of Côte d'Ivoire. It is located in the Abobo, Adjamé districts of the city. Founded in 1996, the University has around 6,500 students training in basic sciences (Maths, Science) and experimental sciences (Physics, Chemistry and Biosciences). The University of Abobo-Adjamé also offers training for Health Sciences. The University was destroyed during armed clashes on 13–14 March 2011.

External links
Official site

Universities in Ivory Coast
Educational institutions established in 1996
Buildings and structures in Abidjan
1996 establishments in Ivory Coast